Nerdcore Rising may refer to:

 Nerdcore Rising, an album by nerdcore rapper MC Frontalot
 Nerdcore Rising (film), by Negin Farsad